In 2010, there were several earthquakes that include Sumatra in their title:
April 2010 Sumatra earthquake
May 2010 Northern Sumatra earthquake

See also
2010 Mentawai earthquake and tsunami
List of earthquakes in Indonesia